The 1981 Honduran Segunda División was the 15th season of the Honduran Segunda División.  Under the management of Raúl Ortiz, C.D. Dandy won the tournament after finishing first in the final round (or Cuadrangular) and obtained promotion to the 1982–83 Honduran Liga Nacional.

Final round
Also known as Cuadrangular.

Standings

Known results

References

Segunda
1981